Ethmia assamensis is a moth in the family Depressariidae. It is found in India, China, Pakistan, Sri Lanka, Bhutan and Nepal. Records for Taiwan are based on misidentifications of Ethmia okinawana.

The forewings are grey with black lines. The hindwings are grey with yellow hair at the base.

The larvae feed on Ehretia ovalifolia, Ehretia serrata and Meliosma myriantha.

References

Moths described in 1879
assamensis
Moths of Japan